The Audi A7 h-tron quattro is a concept hydrogen/electric plug-in hybrid automobile, released by Audi AG in the 2014 Los Angeles Auto Show. The A7 h-tron quattro keeps the same recognizable features of the other A7 variants, but typically has "A7 h-tron" decals (see exterior photos).

The vehicle uses a series of hydrogen tanks connected to a fuel cell, that converts hydrogen into electricity which powers an electric drivetrain.

The A7 h-tron quattro is not in production as yet, though is a working prototype.

Exterior and interior design

Exterior; 

The exterior of the A7 h-tron quattro is very similar to the exterior of other A7 variants, except typically with "A7 h-tron" decals, and an A7 h-tron quattro badge at the rear.

Otherwise, the h-tron is virtually identical to other A7 models.

Interior; 

The interior of the A7 h-tron quattro is also intentionally very similar to other A7 variants, except the system splash screens include the h-tron logo, and where the revolution counter would be on a normal A7, there is the efficiency counter, in a suitable green and orange color scheme.

Mechanical design

Summary; 
The A7 h-tron quattro was designed to look very similar to the other A7 variants. As a result, many of the h-tron components are in similar positions to their petrol/diesel equivalents; the fuel cell is located in the same position as an engine would be, the batteries and some of the hydrogen tanks are where the petrol/diesel tank would be.

Part 1 - Hydrogen 
The A7 h-tron quattro is filled up with hydrogen just as the user would fill any conventional petrol/diesel vehicle, except that the hydrogen system is high pressure, and is sealed tightly during gas transfer from pump to car.

The gas is then sent to one of the 4 high pressure hydrogen tanks, constructed from an aluminium inner shell, and an outer Carbon Fibre shell.

Once the vehicle is started up, the hydrogen is fed into the fuel cell at a controlled rate.

Part 2 - Fuel cell 
Hydrogen from the fuel tanks enters the reducer, which reduces the gas pressure in preparation for the fuel cell process.

During the process, hydrogen molecules combine with oxygen molecules to form particles of water.

An electric charge is created by forcing the hydrogen molecules through a cathode and an anode, before reacting with the oxygen molecules.

Part 3 - Electric drive system 
The electric drive system consists of a series of lithium-ion batteries, along with front and rear axle motors.

Once the electricity has been generated by the fuel cell, it is then either fed directly into the motors, or used to charge the batteries.

During normal driving, the power for the motors is fed directly from the fuel cell, though if a boost is needed, then power from the batteries is also used.

Instead of merely using a normal braking system, the h-tron quattro uses a system adopted by various other electric/hybrid vehicles – regenerative braking. Regenerative braking uses the motors to convert the motion of the vehicle (in the form of kinetic energy) back into electricity to be stored in the batteries.

Life with the A7 h-tron quattro 

The A7 h-tron quattro is able to be filled up with hydrogen at one of the increasing (but currently quite uncommon) hydrogen fuel pumps. If there is a lack of hydrogen, or if the user merely wants to boost the range, then the user can charge up the lithium-ion batteries in the same way as any other plug-in hybrid/electric vehicle.

See also 
 Audi A7

References

A7 sportback h-tron